Coleophora bojalyshi is a moth of the family Coleophoridae. It is found in Uzbekistan.

The larvae feed on the leaves of Arbuscula arbuscula. They create a leafy case, consisting of five to six obliquely arranged pieces. The valve is two-sided and not compact. Larvae can be found in June and (after diapause) again from the end of April to the beginning of May. Young larvae hibernate.

References

bojalyshi
Moths described in 1972
Endemic fauna of Uzbekistan
Moths of Asia